Wojciech Fibak was the defending champion but lost in the final 6–1, 6–1 to Brian Gottfried.

Seeds

  Brian Gottfried (champion)
  Wojciech Fibak (final)
  Sandy Mayer (semifinals)
  Corrado Barazzutti (second round)
  Balázs Taróczy (quarterfinals)
  Jan Kodeš (first round)
  Víctor Pecci (first round)
  Bob Hewitt (quarterfinals)

Draw

Finals

Top half

Bottom half

External links
 1977 Fischer-Grand Prix Draw

Singles